Cours is a French word that can refer to:
 Cours (TV production), a unit of production in Japanese TV programs equivalent to approximately 11 to 13 episodes

Places
Cours is the name or part of the name of several communes in France:

 Cours, Rhône, in the Rhône departement
 Cours, Lot, in the Lot department
 Cours, Lot-et-Garonne, in the Lot-et-Garonne department
 Cours, Deux-Sèvres, in the Deux-Sèvres department
 Cosne-Cours-sur-Loire, in the Nièvre department
 Cours-de-Monségur, in the Gironde department
 Cours-de-Pile, in the Dordogne department
 Cours-la-Ville, in the Rhône department
 Cours-les-Bains, in the Gironde department
 Cours-les-Barres, in the Cher department
 Le Cours, in the Morbihan department
 Magny-Cours, in the Nièvre department
 Mas-des-Cours, in the Aude department

Other 
 Cours (Byzantine general), Byzantine general of the late 6th century

See also
 Cour, a surname